is a former Japanese football player. She played for Japan national team.

Club career
Onodera was born in Yamato on 18 November 1973. In 1989, she joined Yomiuri Beleza (later Nippon TV Beleza). In 1990 season, she debuted in L.League and she was selected Young Player Awards. She played 275 matches for 20 years at the club until end of 2008 season. She was selected Best Eleven 7 times (1991, 1992, 1994, 1995, 1997, 2000 and 2005). The club won L.League championship 11 times. In 2014, she came back at her local club Yamato Sylphid. At the end of 2016 season, she retired.

National team career
In September 1995, Onodera was selected Japan national team for 1995 AFC Championship. At this competition, on 22 September, she debuted against South Korea. She was a member of Japan for 1995, 1999, 2003 World Cup, 1996 and 2004 Summer Olympics. She also played at 1998 and 2001 AFC Championship. She played 23 games for Japan until 2004.

National team statistics

References

External links
 

1973 births
Living people
Kanagawa University alumni
People from Yamato, Kanagawa
Association football people from Kanagawa Prefecture
Japanese women's footballers
Japan women's international footballers
Nadeshiko League players
Nippon TV Tokyo Verdy Beleza players
Yamato Sylphid players
1995 FIFA Women's World Cup players
1999 FIFA Women's World Cup players
2003 FIFA Women's World Cup players
Olympic footballers of Japan
Footballers at the 1996 Summer Olympics
Footballers at the 2004 Summer Olympics
Asian Games medalists in football
Footballers at the 1994 Asian Games
Footballers at the 1998 Asian Games
Women's association football goalkeepers
Asian Games silver medalists for Japan
Asian Games bronze medalists for Japan
Medalists at the 1994 Asian Games
Medalists at the 1998 Asian Games